An excursus (from Latin excurrere, 'to run out of') is a short episode or anecdote in a work of literature. Often excursuses have nothing to do with the matter being discussed by the work, and are used to lighten the atmosphere in a tragic story, a similar function to that of satyr plays in Greek theatre. Sometimes they are used to provide backstory to the matter being discussed at hand, as in Pseudo-Apollodorus' Bibliotheke. In the Middle Ages, the excursus is a favourite rhetorical device to allow the narrator to comment or to suspend the action for reflection. Furthermore, an excursus is often applied to a piece of academic writing to provide digressive information, which does not contribute directly to the line of argument but can still be linked with the overall topic of the text.

Etymologies as excursuses 
Sometimes detailed or fanciful etymologies are used as excursuses. This was used as early as the 5th Century BC by the poet Pindar. The most famous case of etymologies being used as excursuses is in the Golden Legend (ca. 1260) of Jacobus de Voragine, in which the life of each saint is proceeded by an etymology about the origin of the saint's name.

References 

Literary concepts